Karachi Municipal Committee was a public corporation established in 1853 in Karachi, Sindh, Pakistan.

History
The Karachi Conservancy Board was established to control cholera epidemics in Karachi during British rule in 1846. The board was upgraded to the Municipal Commission in 1852. In 1853 the Municipal Commission was turned into the Karachi Municipal Committee. The foundation stone of the Karachi Municipal Corporation Building was laid on Bundar road in 1927.
In 1933 the Karachi Municipal Committee was upgraded to the Karachi Municipal Corporation by the Karachi Municipal Act. The Karachi Municipal Corporation was turned into the Karachi Metropolitan Corporation in 1976.

Zonal municipal committees were established in 1987. The zonal committees were merged again into the Karachi Metropolitan Corporation. Five district municipal corporations were established in 1987. The Karachi Metropolitan Corporation was abolished in 2000 and five district municipal corporations were merged into City District Karachi. The City District Karachi was divided into 18 town and 178 union councils. In 2011 the Sindh Government restored the Karachi Metropolitan Corporation and five district municipal corporations.

See also 
 Karachi Metropolitan Corporation
Karachi Development Authority

References

Government of Karachi
Defunct government departments and agencies of Pakistan
City and town halls in Pakistan